Jody Gavin Rose (born 29 July 1986) is a South African-born Romanian rugby union player. He plays in the fly-half position for amateur Liga Națională de Rugby club Știința Petroșani. 

He also played for Romania's national team the Oaks.

References

External links

 Jody Rose at Timișoara Saracens website

1986 births
Living people
Romanian rugby union players
Romania international rugby union players
Golden Lions players
SCM Rugby Timișoara players
Rugby union fly-halves
Romanian people of South African descent
South African emigrants to Romania